David "Davy" Brodie (9 November 1863 – 1938) was a Scottish footballer who played in the Football League for Stoke.

Brodie was one of a generation of Scottish footballers who moved to England to become professional footballers. Brodie was one of many who arrived at Stoke to earn his living in the sport.

Career
Brodie had started out at his local club Paisley before moving to Abercorn. In 1889 he moved south of the border and joined Stoke along with another fellow Scotsman, Davy Christie. The two Davy's became a major part of Stoke's half-back line during the 1890s and helped the club claim the Football Alliance title in 1890–91. Brodie became a regular member of Stoke's early side and spent eight seasons at the Victoria Ground making 213 appearances before leaving in 1897.

Career statistics

Honours
with Stoke
Football Alliance champions: 1890–91

References

1863 births
1938 deaths
Footballers from Paisley, Renfrewshire
Scottish footballers
Stoke City F.C. players
English Football League players
Abercorn F.C. players
Association football wing halves
Football Alliance players